Erden Alkan (born 12 February 1941) is a Turkish actor living in Germany. He studied at the Max Reinhardt Theatre School in Vienna after graduating from Vefa High School in Istanbul.

Filmography

References

External links 

1941 births
Turkish emigrants to Germany
German male television actors
Turkish male television actors
Living people
German male film actors
Turkish male film actors
20th-century German male actors
21st-century German male actors